Haraldur  is a masculine Icelandic given name. Notable people with the name include:

Haraldur Freyr Guðmundsson (born 1981), Icelandic professional football defender
Haraldur Ingólfsson (born 1970), Icelandic former footballer
Haraldur Kálvsson, from the year 1412 was First Minister of the Faroe Islands
Haraldur Sigurdsson (born 1939), Icelandic volcanologist and geochemist
Haraldur Vignir Sveinbjörnsson (born 1975), Icelandic composer and music arranger

Icelandic masculine given names